Albert Van Blarcom House, is located in Wyckoff, Bergen County, New Jersey, United States. The house was built in 1830 by Albert Van Blarcom and was added to the National Register of Historic Places on January 10, 1983.

See also
National Register of Historic Places listings in Bergen County, New Jersey

References

Houses on the National Register of Historic Places in New Jersey
Houses in Bergen County, New Jersey
National Register of Historic Places in Bergen County, New Jersey
Wyckoff, New Jersey
1830 establishments in New Jersey
New Jersey Register of Historic Places
Houses completed in 1830